The Best of Laura Branigan is the first compilation album by American singer Laura Branigan. It was released in 1988 in Australia, Asia and South Africa, and in 1991 in Japan. The Japanese version included a new recording, "Tokio", which was released as a single only in Japan. The album was followed by The Very Best of Laura Branigan in Australia, as well as Europe, and The Best of Laura Branigan, Volume 2 in South Africa.

The album was later remastered and reissued in South Africa in 1999 under the title Remember: The Very Best of Laura Branigan. The track listing remained the same as the South African 1988 release.

Track listings
Asian version

Australian and South African version

Japanese version

References

1988 greatest hits albums
Laura Branigan albums
Albums produced by David Kershenbaum